Medicine Lodge is a city in and the county seat of Barber County, Kansas, United States.  As of the 2020 census, the population of the city was 1,781.

History

19th century
The particular medicine lodge, mystery house or sacred tabernacle from which the Medicine Lodge River received its name was in reality an arbor-like shelter of tree trunks and leafy branches which was erected by the Kiowa people for the celebration of their annual sun dance in the summer of 1866. It was in the valley of the Medicine Lodge River, several miles below the present town of Medicine Lodge, which is at the mouth of Elm Creek.  In their own language, the Kiowa people called this stream A-ya-dalda P’a, meaning "Timber-hill River." The Kiowa had considered the site sacred due to the high content of Epsom salts in the river.

In October 1867, the Medicine Lodge Treaty was a set of three treaties signed between the United States of America and the Kiowa, Comanche, Plains Apache, Southern Cheyenne, and Southern Arapaho. The site of the Peace Council camp was about three miles above that of the future town and on the same side of the river. A Peace Treaty Pageant, first presented in 1927 in an outdoor amphitheater on a quarter section of Kansas prairie, commemorates this significant event in Western history.

Settlers led by a man named John Hutchinson founded the town of Medicine Lodge north of the confluence of Elm Creek and the Medicine Lodge River in February 1873. The community grew rapidly with a hotel, stores, and a post office established within a year.

In 1874, in response to Native raids in the region, residents and the state militia constructed a stockade. A group of Osage killed three settlers within a few miles of the compound, but no direct attack on the fortifications occurred. Medicine Lodge was incorporated as a city in 1879.

Temperance activist Carrie Nation launched her crusade against the sale of alcohol while living in Medicine Lodge in 1900. Her home and a reproduction of the 1873 stockade are open to the public.

Geography
Medicine Lodge is located at  (37.284352, -98.580977) in south-central Kansas in the Red Hills region of the Great Plains. The city sits immediately north of the confluence of the Medicine Lodge River and Elm Creek. The city is on the northeast side of the river. Elm Creek flows south around the eastern and southern sides of the city. A tributary of Elm Creek, which flows south through Medicine Lodge, has been dammed immediately north of the city to form a reservoir, Barber County State Lake.

The city is located at the junction of U.S. Routes 160 and 281.

Climate
Medicine Lodge has a humid subtropical climate (Köppen Cfa) with hot, humid summers and cold, dry winters. The average temperature in Medicine Lodge is 57.3 °F (14 °C), and the average yearly precipitation is 26.2 inches (660 mm). On average, January is the coolest month, July is the warmest month, and June is the wettest month. The hottest temperature recorded in Medicine Lodge was 118 °F (48 °C) in 1936; the coldest temperature recorded was -22 °F (-30 °C) in 1905.

Demographics

2010 census
As of the census of 2010, there were 2,009 people, 876 households, and 530 families residing in the city. The racial makeup of the city was 96.3% White, 0.7% African American, 0.3% Native American, 0.4% Asian, 1.4% from other races, and 0.9% from two or more races. Hispanic or Latino of any race were 2.4% of the population.

There were 876 households, of which 29.5% had children under the age of 18 living with them, 46.3% were married couples living together, 8.4% had a female householder with no husband present, 5.7% had a male householder with no wife present, and 39.5% were non-families. 35.6% of all households were made up of individuals, and 14.9% had someone living alone who was 65 years of age or older. The average household size was 2.28 and the average family size was 2.93.

The median age in the city was 40 years. 25.6% of residents were under the age of 18; 7% were between the ages of 18 and 24; 22.4% were from 25 to 44; 27.3% were from 45 to 64; and 17.9% were 65 years of age or older. The gender makeup of the city was 50.7% male and 49.3% female.

2000 census
As of the census of 2000, there were 2,193 people, 922 households, and 609 families residing in the city. The racial makeup of the city was 98.08% White, 0.36% African American, 0.09% Native American, 0.09% Asian, 0.36% from other races, and 1.00% from two or more races. Hispanic or Latino of any race were 1.69% of the population.

There were 922 households, out of which 30.9% had children under the age of 18 living with them, 53.8% were married couples living together, 9.1% had a female householder with no husband present, and 33.9% were non-families. 30.7% of all households were made up of individuals, and 16.7% had someone living alone who was 65 years of age or older. The average household size was 2.34 and the average family size was 2.90.

In the city, the population was spread out, with 25.1% under the age of 18, 7.2% from 18 to 24, 24.7% from 25 to 44, 22.2% from 45 to 64, and 20.9% who were 65 years of age or older. The median age was 41 years. For every 100 females, there were 93.6 males. For every 100 females age 18 and over, there were 88.6 males.

The median income for a household in the city was $35,262, and the median income for a family was $41,053. Males had a median income of $30,319 versus $18,750 for females. The per capita income for the city was $16,231. About 7.4% of families and 9.4% of the population were below the poverty line, including 8.7% of those under age 18 and 4.6% of those age 65 or over.

Economy
 National Gypsum

Government
Medicine Lodge has a mayor-council form of government. The city council consists of five members, who are elected on a rotating schedule. The day-to-day operations of city government are managed by a City Administrator who operates under the supervision of the elected officials. The current City Administrator is Brian Daily who started in November 2022.

Education
Barber County North USD 254 provides public primary and secondary education with two schools in Medicine Lodge: Medicine Lodge Grade School (Grades Pre-K-6) and Medicine Lodge Junior-Senior High School (7-12).

Transportation
U.S. Route 281, which runs north-south, and U.S. Route 160, which runs east-west, intersect in the southwest corner of the city.

Medicine Lodge is the western terminus of the Medicine Lodge line of the V&S Railway. The rail line runs northwest-southeast through the southwestern part of the city.

Media

Print
Newspapers
The Gyp Hill Premiere, weekly

Radio
The following radio stations are licensed to Medicine Lodge:

FM

Culture
Triennially, Medicine Lodge holds a pageant to commemorate the 1867 Medicine Lodge Treaty, signed near the city's present-day location. The city first held the pageant in 1927 and has held it every three years since 1961.

Area attractions
 Carrie Nation House
 Stockade House.
 Peace Treaty Statue, located on North Main Street.
 Wisner Fountain, originally used to water horses on North Main Street.
 Kansas Historical Marker - Medicine Lodge Peace Treaties, located 1 mile east of Medicine Lodge.

Notable people
 Carleton Beals (1893–1979), journalist, author, historian, political activist
 B. H. Born (1932–2013), All American basketball player
 Dorothy DeLay (1917–2002), violin instructor at Juilliard, Sarah Lawrence College, University of Cincinnati. 
 Edward Hunkeler (1894–1970), Roman Catholic Archbishop
 Chester Long (1860–1934), U.S. Representative and U.S. Senator from Kansas
 Carrie Nation (1846–1911), radical member of the temperance movement which opposed alcohol before the advent of prohibition of alcohol
 Jerry Simpson (1842–1905), U.S. Representative from Kansas
 Jasper Tincher (1878–1951), U.S. Representative from Kansas

References

Further reading

 Yost, Nellie Snyder. Medicine Lodge: The Story of a Kansas Frontier Town. Sage Books: Chicago, 1970.

External links

 City of Medicine Lodge
 Medicine Lodge - Directory of Public Officials
 USD 254, local school district
 Lincoln Library
  Medicine Lodge Peace Treaty Pageant
 Medicine Lodge, Kansas Barber County, Kansas: History and Genealogy
 Digital Medicine Lodge History
 Medicine Lodge city map, KDOT

Cities in Kansas
County seats in Kansas
Cities in Barber County, Kansas
1873 establishments in Kansas
Populated places established in 1873